IRNSS-1H was the eighth in the Indian Regional Navigational Satellite System (IRNSS) series of satellites, after IRNSS-1A, IRNSS-1B, IRNSS-1C, IRNSS-1D, IRNSS-1E, IRNSS-1F and IRNSS-1G. It was lost in the launch failure of PSLV-C39 on August 31, 2017.

Overview
IRNSS-1H was India's first satellite to be assembled, integrated and tested by private firms under ISRO supervision and was intended to replace the failed IRNSS-1A and complete the NAVIC constellation of geosynchronous navigation satellites which is a  ₹1420-crore independent regional navigation satellite system developed by India.

Payload:

Navigation payload in S band and L5 band, dual Helix Array Antenna (1.1 m diameter)
CDMA ranging payload in C band
Rubidium Atomic Frequency Standard
Corner Cube Retro Reflector for Laser Ranging

Propulsion: Conventional bipropellant system with Mono Methyl Hydrazine as fuel and Mixed Oxides of Nitrogen (MON-3) as oxidizer.

Twelve 22N thrusters.
One 440N Liquid Apogee Motor (LAM)
Two 390 litres propellant tanks
One 67 litre pressurant tank with CFRP overwrap and Titanium liner.

Launch
PSLV-C39 carrying IRNSS-1H was using XL variant of Polar Satellite Launch Vehicle on its forty-first flight. Launch occurred as scheduled at 19:00 IST or 13:30 UTC, 31 August 2017 from Second Launch Pad of SDSC (SHAR) aiming for orbit of 284 × 20,650 km (Sub GTO) with 19.2° inclination. Vehicle performed initial flight sequences as planned but 203 seconds into flight, the payload fairing jettison event was not accomplished. Excluding this mid-flight malfunction, rest of the planned flight sequences including spacecraft separation at 17 minutes and 56 seconds occurred nominally but due to extra 1182 kg mass of fairing, target orbit could not be achieved leaving the combined assembly of PSLV upper-stage (PS4), enclosed payload fairing and trapped IRNSS-1H spacecraft in 167.4 × 6554.8 km orbit with 19.18° inclination. Liquid Apogee Motor (LAM) of IRNSS-1H was fired to help it come out of the payload fairing and to consume the propellants and passivate the spacecraft.

Prior to PSLV C39 / IRNSS-1H, last launch failure involving a PSLV happened 24 years ago in 1993, following which many variants of PSLV rockets have had 39 successful launches.

Cause of failure
PSLV-C39 payload fairing separation mechanism consisted of horizontal and vertical jettisoning system. At the scheduled time during flight separation command was issued and the horizontal jettisoning system functioned nominally but the vertical jettisoning system malfunctioned and subsequently two halves of the payload fairing could not move apart. The cause of malfunction was identified as non-initiation of detonation in pyro device of vertical jettisoning system.

Orbit decay
Combined assembly of PSLV fourth stage, payload fairings and enclosed IRNSS-1H spacecraft within it weighed between 2675 and 3480 kg and re-entered Earth's atmosphere around 19:23 UTC on 2 March 2019 over Vanuatu.

See also

GPS-aided geo-augmented navigation (GAGAN)
Satellite navigation

References

External links
ISRO Future Programmes

Spacecraft launched by India in 2017
IRNSS satellites
Spacecraft launched by PSLV rockets
Satellite launch failures